Zephyrine Frances "Zeph" Gladstone (20 September 1937 - 28 October 2002) was an English television actress, from Norwood in south London. She was best known for her role as the "tart with a heart" hairdresser Vera Downend on the soap opera Crossroads, a role she played from 1970 to 1977.

Gladstone started her television career in ITV Play of the Week in 1964. She moved on to a permanent part on the series Dixon of Dock Green. She also appeared in 'The Baron' as a revolutionary in 'Evening of Hunter', with future 'Crossroads' star Sue Lloyd, in her role on Crossroads that was most enduring. Gladstone started on the series in June 1970, playing an experienced hairdresser setting up a salon business in the Crossroads Motel. Despite a rough veneer and bad choices, Gladstone's character, Vera Downend, was essentially a "positive" character and developed favourable fan reaction. Gladstone was signed to a contract, which she kept until her departure in October 1977.

Gladstone's most famous role would also be her last on television. She died in London in 2002 at the age of 65.

Filmography
Oh! What a Lovely War (1969) - Sir John's Chauffeuse (uncredited)
The Oblong Box (1969) - Trench's Girl

External links

1937 births
2002 deaths
English soap opera actresses